Nataliya Chikina (born 1 February 1975) is a Kazakhstani diver. She competed at the 1996 Summer Olympics and the 2000 Summer Olympics.

References

1975 births
Living people
Kazakhstani female divers
Olympic divers of Kazakhstan
Divers at the 1996 Summer Olympics
Divers at the 2000 Summer Olympics
Sportspeople from Almaty
Asian Games medalists in diving
Divers at the 1994 Asian Games
Asian Games bronze medalists for Kazakhstan
Medalists at the 1994 Asian Games
20th-century Kazakhstani women